Chief of Chaplains may refer to:

Chaplain General, a term used in the Anglican Church
Chaplain General section of Military Chaplain, term used by some militaries for senior chaplain, synonymous with Chief of Chaplains
Chief of Chaplains of the United States Army
Chief of Chaplains of the United States Navy
Chief of Chaplains of the United States Air Force
Chiefs of Chaplains of the United States
Current U.S. Military Chiefs of Chaplains (template)

Also:
Chaplain of the United States Marine Corps, Senior Chaplain in the U.S. Marines, a position filled by the Deputy Chief of Chaplains in the United States Navy
Chaplain of the Coast Guard, Senior Chaplain in the U.S. Coast Guard, a position filled by a senior U.S. Navy Chaplain at the rank of U.S. Navy Captain
Armed Forces Chaplains Board, a U.S. military board made up of the three Chiefs of Chaplains and active-duty Deputy Chiefs of Chaplains of the Army, Navy, and Air Force